Artech House (a.k.a. Artech House Publishers) is a publisher of professional scientific and engineering books. It located in London, United Kingdom and Norwood, Massachusetts, United States.

Artech House is a subsidiary of Horizon House Publications, Inc.

Topics published 
Artech specializes in books about microwaves and radar, GNSS, power engineering, space engineering, electronic warfare, signal processing, and other communications-related topics.

References

External links 
  Artech House US website
  Artech House UK web site

Book publishing companies of the United Kingdom
Book publishing companies based in Massachusetts
Companies based in Norfolk County, Massachusetts
Companies based in the City of Westminster
Norwood, Massachusetts